The Listener is a Canadian science fiction drama set in Toronto about a young paramedic named Toby Logan (Craig Olejnik) with the ability to listen to people's most intimate thoughts. The series was created by Michael Amo and is produced by Shaftesbury Films for CTV and Fox International Channels. The pilot episode was directed by Clement Virgo.  NBC aired the program as a Summer series in 2009 but was dissatisfied with its ratings.

It was announced on November 17, 2009 that The Listener had been renewed for a 13 episode second season. Production for the second season began almost a year after the announcement of the renewal, in September 2010, and was scheduled to end February 2011. The second season premiered February 8, 2011 on CTV and after 10 episodes CTV began broadcasting the entire show from the beginning. The remaining three episodes were eventually shown in August 2011. In the UK, all thirteen episodes ran from March 1, 2011 to May 24, 2011. It was announced on June 1, 2011 that The Listener had been renewed for a 13-episode third season.  On October 4, 2011, it was announced that production on season three was under-way and was to conclude in February 2012 and that ION Television had acquired rights to the first two seasons for broadcast in the U.S. in 2012. After such success with the first two seasons, ION Television began to air Seasons 3, 4 and 5.  The program was popular enough on ION that the network broadcast all available episodes and became partners with Shaftesbury, CTV, and Fox International in the production of the series.  According to an ION press release, the program has averaged over 1 million viewers per episode in the USA since the network began broadcasting it.
Although the shows ratings in Canada were higher in 2014 than in previous years, on August 6, 2014 CTV announced that The Listener would conclude on August 18, 2014 with its final 65th episode.

Series overview

Episodes

Season 1 (2009)

Season 2 (2011)

Season 3 (2012)

Season 4 (2013)

Season 5 (2014)

Canadian / U.S. ratings

Season 1: 2009

Season 2: 2011

Season 3: 2012

Season 4: 2013

Season 5: 2014

References

External links
 at ctv.ca

Lists of Canadian drama television series episodes